Rollback is a Cold War term for the use of military force to "roll back" communism in countries where it had taken root.

Rollback or roll back may also refer to:

Science and technology
 Rollback (data management), the operation of returning a database to some previous state
 Rollback, in transaction processing
 Trench rollback, a geology term
 Rollback, a term used in Netcode

Art, entertainment and media
 Rollback (novel), a 2007 science fiction novel by Canadian author Robert J. Sawyer
 Roll Back, an album by Irish rock band Horslips

Business
 Share rollback, also known as Reverse stock split

Other uses
 Rollback (legislation), legislating to repeal or reduce the effects of a specific law or regulation
 Rollback (roller coaster), a situation in which a launched roller coaster is not launched fast enough to reach the top of the first hill
 Rollback, the civil service salary reductions for constitutional deference known as a Saxbe fix
 Rollback, a form of flatbed tow truck

See also
 Roll Back Malaria Partnership (RBM Partnership), against malaria; at one time chaired by Tedros Adhanom
 Rollback attack (disambiguation)